Klobukino is a rural locality (a village) in Sidorovskoye Rural Settlement, Gryazovetsky District, Vologda Oblast, Russia. The population was 2 as of 2002.

Geography
Demyankovo is the nearest rural locality.

References

Rural localities in Gryazovetsky District